Hadronemidea is a genus of plant bugs in the family Miridae.

Species
 Hadronemidea echinata (Gruetzmacher & Schaffner, 1977)
 Hadronemidea esau Reuter, 1908

References

Miridae genera
Orthotylini